Bijna een dubbele moord in Lutjebroek is a 1920 short Dutch silent film directed by Harry Waghalter.

Cast
 Frensky - Augurkie
 Henri le Dent - Worteltje
 Harry Waghalter
 Ruth Arden
 Jan Grootveld

External links 
 

1920 films
Dutch black-and-white films
Dutch silent short films